Jani-King International, Inc. is an American chain of cleaning service franchise. The company provides cleaning for public spaces such as offices, retails spaces, hotels, and stadiums.

In 2001, it was the title sponsor of the NASCAR event at the Texas Motor Speedway now known as the SRS Distribution 250.

Jani-King's corporate offices are in Addison, Texas.

From its corporate headquarters, and through regional support offices in local markets, Jani-King provides its franchise owners additional training and certification programs for servicing hotels and hospitals. In August 2012, Jani-King partnered with Buffalo Bills.

See also
 List of cleaning companies

References

External links
 Official website

Cleaning companies of the United States
Companies based in Addison, Texas
Dallas–Fort Worth metroplex